Houchins v. KQED, Inc., 438 U.S. 1 (1978), was a 1978 United States Supreme Court case in which the Court refused to recognize a "right of access", under the First Amendment, to interview particular prisoners.

Procedural history

Sheriff Houchins of Alameda County in California controlled all access to the County Jail. KQED, a local radio and television operator, reported on a prisoner suicide in the jail and included a statement from a staff psychiatrist that living conditions there were responsible for the prisoner's illnesses.

KQED requested to inspect and photograph the jail, but the Sheriff refused. KQED and two local branches of the NAACP sued the Sheriff under 42 U. S. C. § 1983, claiming that the Sheriff's refusal violated the First Amendment.
The District Court issued a preliminary injunction to prevent the Sheriff from outright denying KQED and other news media from visiting the jail and bringing audio and video recording devices.

Sheriff Houchins appealed the order to the Court of Appeals. After his appeal was denied, he appealed to the Supreme Court.

Decision of the Court

The court voted 4-3 in favor of Sheriff Houchins, and reversed and remanded the case back the District Court. Chief Justice Burger wrote the Majority opinion, joined by Justice White and Rehnquist. Justice Stewart concurred with Judgment, while Justice Marshall and Blackmun abstained from the consideration or decision of the case.

Majority opinion 
Justice Burger held "the media have no special right of access to the Alameda County Jail different from or greater than that accorded the public generally." He based the decision on previous precedent that the First Amendment did not compel either private or public entities to disclose information to the press.
He also declined to expand the First Amendment's on policy grounds. "Whether the government should open penal institutions in the manner sought by respondents is a question of policy which a legislative body might appropriately resolve one way or the other." Information about jail conditions was still available through other channels, "albeit not as conveniently as [KQED] might prefer."

Concurring opinion by Stewart 

Justice Stewart agreed with the Majority's decision to overturn the District Court's injunction because he felt it was overly broad. However he felt that a more limited injunction should replace it. He also felt that the press should be given the ability to bring audio & video recording equipment, even if the general public was prohibited from doing so, since they are there to convey information to the general public.

Dissent
Justice Stevens wrote the dissent, joined by Justices Brennan and Powell.

The dissent disagreed with the Majority's opinion, and felt that Sheriff Houchins should have continued to be compelled to grant KQED and other news media access to the jail. They felt that the Sheriff had restricted KQED access because he was attempting to hide the conditions. They agreed with the District Court's that "the broad restraints on access were not required by legitimate penological interests." The Sheriff's later changes to his policy to allow for media tours was only instituted after the lawsuit, and still had serious limitations, such as the no camera policy, on the media's ability to gather information.

As a policy matter, the dissent wrote "there is no legitimate penological justification for concealing from citizens the conditions in which their fellow citizens are being confined[]" and "[a]n official prison policy of concealing such knowledge from the public by arbitrarily cutting off the flow of information at its source abridges the freedom of speech and of the press protected by the First and Fourteenth Amendments to the Constitution."

Also, the Dissent criticized the Majority's application of Pell to this case because the prison rule that prevented the Press from speaking to specific prisoners was "not part of an attempt by the State to conceal the conditions in its prisons," but "was an isolated limitation on the efforts of the press to gather information about those conditions[,]" imposed only after disciplinary problems had occurred.

Notes

A 2009 Human Rights Watch report, on prison conditions in the United States, claimed that this means that "the kind of public and media scrutiny that helps prevent abuses of power in other government institutions simply does not operate in places of incarceration."

References

External links
 

Penal system in California
United States Free Speech Clause case law
United States Supreme Court cases
United States Supreme Court cases of the Burger Court
1978 in United States case law
History of Alameda County, California
KQED Inc.